Ward Lake may refer to the following bodies of water:

Lakes
In the United States
Ward Lake (Florida)
Ward Lake (McLeod and Sibley counties, Minnesota)
Ward Lake (Thurston County, Washington)

Elsewhere
Ward Lake (Antarctica)
Ward Lake (Vancouver Island), Canada
Ward's Lake (Shillong), Meghalaya, India